Kongsberg Skisenter is a ski resort located in Funkelia in Kongsberg. It is owned by Skisenterdrift AS which also bought the ski resort Grefsenkollen Skisenter in 2006.

Information
The resort has 10 slopes which accumulate approximately 10 kilometers of tracks, one chair elevator and four lifts. The capacity of the elevators is 7200 persons per hour. The highest point is 565 meters above sea, while the lowest is 235, giving a height difference of 330 meters. In 2009 the resort had a turnover of 34,8 million Norwegian Kroner and a profit of 9,8 million Norwegian Kroner. There is also 55 kilometers of prepared tracks for cross country skiing.

Slopes

Green - Easy slope
Turisten (2200 m)
Barnebakken (150 m)
Blue - Easy to medium
Konningen Skicrossbakke (1900 m)
Avstikker´n (300 m)
Red - Medium to hard
Ormen Lange (1800 m)
Tversover´n (200 m)
Black - Hard
Eksperten (1700 m)
Slalåmen (500 m)

References

External links
 Official webpage

Ski areas and resorts in Norway